Nina Yang Bongiovi is a BAFTA-nominated Asian American film producer, with extensive experience in creative development, film finance and physical production. In 2009, she partnered with actor Forest Whitaker to create Significant Productions; together, they have produced Fruitvale Station (2013) by Ryan Coogler, Dope (2015) by Rick Famuyiwa, Songs My Brothers Taught Me (2015) by Chloe Zhao, Roxanne Roxanne (2017) by Michael Larnell, Sorry to Bother You (2018) by Boots Riley, and Passing (2021) by Rebecca Hall. Nina is married to Matthew Bongiovi, the younger brother of musician Jon Bon Jovi.

Career
Bongiovi received her graduate degree in Entertainment Management at the University of Southern California. She spent the first decade of her career working in both the United States and Hong Kong film industries. During this time, she was involved in productions including China Strike Force (2000, Hong Kong), Mail Order Wife (2004, U.S.), Confessions of an Action Star (2005, U.S.), and The Children of Huang Shi (2008, China). In 2010, she met actor Forest Whitaker and they partnered to form Significant Productions, a production company that produces multi-cultural feature films, documentaries, and premium television series.

Bongiovi and Whitaker produced the 2013 American film Fruitvale Station, written and directed by Ryan Coogler and based on the story of the shooting of Oscar Grant in 2009. Bongiovi became involved with the project after film professor at USC, Jed Dannenbaum, contacted her to introduce her to Coogler, who was one of Dannenbaum's current students. Fruitvale Station met with critical acclaim, winning the 2013 Sundance Film Festival Grand Jury Prize and Audience Award as well as the 2013 Cannes Film Festival L'Avenir Award. For their work on the film, Bongiovi and Whitaker won the Producers Guild of America Stanley Kramer Award, which is given for films that highlight social issues.

In 2014, Bongiovi and Whitaker produced Repentance, also starring Whitaker, followed by the 2015 films Dope and Songs My Brothers Taught Me. Both Dope and Songs My Brothers Taught Me were selected to play at the 2015 Sundance Film Festival and the 2015 Cannes Film Festival.

Bongiovi and Whitaker produced Sorry to Bother You (2018), a satire film directed by Boots Riley.

References

External links

American women film producers
American film producers
American people of Chinese descent
USC School of Cinematic Arts alumni
Living people
Year of birth missing (living people)
21st-century American women